Tom Brown and Jack Kramer were the defending champions, but decided not to play together. Brown partnered with Budge Patty but lost in the first round to Tony Mottram and Bill Sidwell. Kramer partnered with Bob Falkenburg, and they defeated Mottram and Sidwell in the final, 8–6, 6–3, 6–3 to win the gentlemen's doubles tennis title at the 1947 Wimbledon Championship.

Seeds

  Bob Falkenburg /  Jack Kramer (champions)
  John Bromwich /  Dinny Pails (semifinals)
  Geoff Brown /  Colin Long (semifinals)
  Tom Brown /  Budge Patty (first round)

Draw

Finals

Top half

Section 1

Section 2

Bottom half

Section 3

Section 4

References

External links

Men's Doubles
Wimbledon Championship by year – Men's doubles